Traditional Chinese characters are one type of standard Chinese character sets of the contemporary written Chinese. The traditional characters had taken shapes since the clerical change and mostly remained in the same structure they took at the introduction of the regular script in the 2nd century. Over the following centuries, traditional characters were regarded as the standard form of printed Chinese characters or literary Chinese throughout the Sinosphere until the middle of the 20th century, before different script reforms initiated by countries using Chinese characters as a writing system.

Traditional Chinese characters remain in common use in Taiwan, Hong Kong and Macau, as well as in most overseas Chinese communities outside Southeast Asia; in addition, Hanja in Korean language remains virtually identical to traditional characters, which is still used to a certain extent in South Korea, despite differing standards used among these countries over some variant Chinese characters. In Taiwan, the standardization of traditional characters is stipulated through the promulgation of the Standard Form of National Characters, which is regulated by Taiwan's Ministry of Education. In contrast, simplified Chinese characters are used in Mainland China, Malaysia, and Singapore in official publications.

The debate on traditional and simplified Chinese characters has been a long-running issue among Chinese communities. Currently, many Chinese online newspapers allow users to switch between both character sets.

History
The modern shapes of traditional Chinese characters first appeared with the emergence of the clerical script during the Han dynasty and have been more or less stable since the 5th century (during the Southern and Northern dynasties).

The retronym "traditional Chinese" is used to contrast traditional characters with "simplified Chinese characters", a standardized character set introduced in the 1950s by the government of the People's Republic of China on Mainland China.

Modern usage in Chinese-speaking areas

Mainland China
Although simplified characters are endorsed by the government of China and taught in schools, there is no prohibition against using traditional characters. Traditional characters are used informally, primarily in handwriting (Chinese calligraphy), but also for inscriptions and religious text. They are often retained in logos or graphics to evoke yesteryear. Nonetheless, the vast majority of media and communications in China use simplified characters.

Hong Kong and Macau
In Hong Kong and Macau, traditional Chinese has been the legal written form since colonial times. In recent years, however, simplified Chinese characters are also used to accommodate Mainland Chinese tourists and immigrants. The use of simplified characters has led to residents being concerned about protecting their local heritage.

Taiwan
Taiwan has never adopted simplified characters. The use of simplified characters in government documents and educational settings is discouraged by the government of Taiwan. Nevertheless, simplified characters (簡體字) might be understood by some Taiwanese people, as it could take little effort to learn them. Some writing stroke simplifications have long been in folk handwriting from the ancient time, existing as an informal variant form (俗字) of the traditional characters.

Philippines
The Chinese Filipino community continues to be one of the most conservative in Southeast Asia regarding simplification. Although major public universities teach simplified characters, many well-established Chinese schools still use traditional characters. Publications such as the Chinese Commercial News, World News, and United Daily News all use traditional characters. So do some magazines from Hong Kong, such as the Yazhou Zhoukan. On the other hand, the Philippine Chinese Daily uses simplified characters.

DVD subtitles for film or television mostly use traditional characters, that subtitling being influenced by Taiwanese usage and by both countries being within the same DVD region, 3.

United States
Having immigrated to the United States during the second half of the 19th century, well before the institution of simplified characters, Chinese Americans have long used traditional characters. Therefore, US public notices and signage in Chinese are generally in traditional Chinese.

Nomenclature

Traditional Chinese characters are known by different names within the Chinese-speaking world. The government of Taiwan officially calls traditional Chinese characters standard characters or orthodox characters. However, the same term is used outside Taiwan to distinguish standard, simplified, and traditional characters from variant and idiomatic characters.

In contrast, users of traditional characters outside Taiwan—such as those in Hong Kong, Macau, and overseas Chinese communities, and also users of simplified Chinese characters—call the traditional characters complex characters, old characters, or full Chinese characters to distinguish them from simplified Chinese characters.

Some users of traditional characters argue that traditional characters are the original form of Chinese characters and cannot be called "complex". Similarly, they argue that simplified characters cannot be called "standard" because they are not used in all Chinese-speaking regions. Conversely, supporters of simplified Chinese characters object to the description of traditional characters as "standard", since they view the new simplified characters as the contemporary standard used by the vast majority of Chinese speakers. They also point out that traditional characters are not truly traditional, as many Chinese characters have been made more elaborate over time.

Some people refer to traditional characters as simply proper characters ( or  ) and to simplified characters as "simplified-stroke characters" or "reduced-stroke characters" (simplified- and reduced- are actually homophones in Mandarin Chinese, both pronounced jiǎn; ㄐㄧㄢˇ ).

Printed text
When printing text, people in mainland China and Singapore use the simplified system. In writing, most people use informal, sometimes personal, simplifications. In the old days,, there were two main uses for alternative characters. First, alternative characters were used to name an important person in less formal contexts, reserving traditional characters for use in formal contexts as a sign of respect, an instance of what is called "offence-avoidance" in Chinese. Secondly, alternative characters were used when the same characters were repeated in context to show that the repetition was intentional rather than a mistake.

Computer encoding and fonts
In the past, traditional Chinese was most often rendered using the Big5 character encoding scheme, a scheme that favors traditional Chinese. However, Unicode, which gives equal weight to both simplified and traditional Chinese characters, has become increasingly popular as a rendering method. There are various IMEs (Input Method Editors) available to input Chinese characters.

In font filenames and descriptions, the acronym TC is used to signify the use of traditional Chinese characters to differentiate fonts that use SC for Simplified Chinese characters.

Web pages
The World Wide Web Consortium recommends the use of the language tag  as a language attribute and Content-Language value to specify web-page content in traditional Chinese.

Usage in other languages
In Japanese, kyūjitai is the now-obsolete, non-simplified form of simplified (shinjitai) Jōyō kanji. These non-simplified characters are mostly congruent with the traditional characters in Chinese, save for a few minor regional graphical differences. Furthermore, characters that are not included in the Jōyō list are generally recommended to be printed in their original non-simplified forms, save for a few exceptions.

In Korean, traditional Chinese characters are identical with Hanja (now almost completely replaced by Hangul for general use in most cases, but nonetheless unchanged from Chinese except for some Korean-made Hanja).

Traditional Chinese characters are also used by non-Chinese ethnic groups, especially the Maniq people—of southern Yala Province of Thailand and northeastern Kedah state of Malaysia—for writing the Kensiu language.

See also
Simplified Chinese characters
Debate on traditional and simplified Chinese characters
Chữ Nôm
Hanja
Kaishu
Kanji
Kyūjitai ( or  – Japanese traditional characters)
Multiple association of converting Simplified Chinese to Traditional Chinese

References 

Chinese characters